Plaza Shell is the office building for Shell Malaysia in Kota Kinabalu, Sabah, Malaysia. The building is an administration area for the management of supply and marketing of retail fuels, lubricants, commercial fuels, aviation and marine products for Sabah markets. The building also include a showroom for Mercedes-Benz, a shopping centre and medical clinics, pharmacy and physiotherapy clinics. The building opening was officiated in November 2015 by the Chief Minister of Sabah, Musa Aman.

References

External links 
 

2015 establishments in Malaysia
Shopping malls in Sabah
Buildings and structures in Kota Kinabalu
Shopping malls established in 2015